The following is a list of companies based in Gaborone, Botswana

Banks
 ABN AMRO
 ABN AMRO Outside Banking Unit
 BancABC
 Bank of Baroda
 Bank Gaborone
 Barclays Bank
 Capital Bank
 First National Bank of Botswana
 Stanbic Bank
 Standard Chartered Bank
 Bank of India

Basic materials 
 Debswana, diamonds and coal

Consumer goods 
 Botswana Meat Commission
 Kgalagadi Breweries Limited
 Sechaba Brewery Holdings

Consumer services 

 Choppies
 Shoprite
 Woolworths Foods

Financials 
 BancABC, financial services
 Bank of Botswana, central bank
 Letshego Holdings Limited
 Botswana Stock Exchange

Industrials 
 Botswana Railways, railway

Media 
 The Botswana Gazette, newspaper
 Botswana Guardian, newspaper
 Botswana TV, television
 Mmegi, newspaper

Telecommunications 
 Botswana Telecommunications Corporation
 Orange Botswana
 Mascom
 GCSat

Travel & leisure 
 Air Botswana, airline 
 Mack Air, charter airline
 Wilderness Air, charter airline

Utilities 
 Botswana Power Corporation
 Water Utilities Corporation (Botswana)

References

See also
 Economy of Botswana

Gaborone
Botswana companies